National Masturbation Day, also known as International Masturbation Day, is an annual event held to protect and celebrate the "right to masturbate". The first National Masturbation Day was May 7, 1995, after sex-positive retailer Good Vibrations declared the day in honor of Surgeon General Joycelyn Elders, who was fired by President Bill Clinton in 1994 for suggesting masturbation be part of the sex education curriculum for students.

International Masturbation Day has since been expanded to include the entire month of May as International Masturbation Month.

See also

Bodily integrity
Masturbate-a-thon
No Nut November
Right to sexuality
Self-love
Sex-positive movement
Wank Week

References

External links
 When Is National Masturbation Day? at whatnationaldayisit.com

May observances
Recurring events established in 1995
Masturbation